Tork Kola (also Romanized as Tork Kolā) is a village in Bala Khiyaban-e Litkuh Rural District, in the Central District of Amol County, Mazandaran Province, Iran. At the 2006 census, its population was 1,032, in 270 families.

References 

Populated places in Amol County